Kevan Tebay (2 February 1936 – 13 August 1996) was an English cricketer active from 1959 to 1963 who played for Lancashire. He was born and died in Bolton. He appeared in 15 first-class matches, scoring 509 runs with a highest score of 106, his only first-class century, and held three catches.

Notes

1936 births
1996 deaths
English cricketers
Lancashire cricketers